Events in the year 1885 in Norway.

Incumbents
Monarch: Oscar II
Prime Minister: Johan Sverdrup

Events

Norwegian parliamentary election is won by the Liberal Party of Norway.
26 February – A speed skating duel at Frognerkilen between Axel Paulsen and Renke van der Zee was attended by between 20,000 and 30,000 spectators.

Arts and literature

Fra Kristiania-Bohêmen, novel by Hans Jæger

Births

January to March
8 January – Anders Hove, politician (died 1978)
8 January – Anders Tjøstolvsen Noddeland, politician (died 1960)
16 January – Kristian Østervold, sailor and Olympic gold medallist (died 1960)
27 January – Gunnar Grantz, Olympic rower (died 1941).
1 February – Rasmus Hatledal, topographer and military officer (died 1963)
26 February – Odd Isaachsen Willoch, naval officer (died 1940)
11 March – Per Mathiesen, gymnast and Olympic gold medallist (died 1971)
17 March – Einar Strøm, gymnast and Olympic gold medallist (died 1964)

April to June
4 April – Daniel Johansen, track and field athlete (died 1967)
26 April – Hans Peter Elisa Lødrup, journalist, newspaper editor, non-fiction writer and politician (died 1955).
27 May – Kristian Johan Bodøgaard, politician (died 1971)
2 June – Tollef Tollefsen, rower and Olympic bronze medallist (died 1963)
2 June – Carl Julius Alvin Westerlund, politician (died 1952)
15 June – Ole Landmark, architect (died 1970)
24 June – Olaf Holtedahl, geologist (died 1975)

July to September
28 July – Jens Martin Arctander Jenssen, politician (died 1968)
17 August – Alfred Høy, manager of Meraker Smelteverk (died 1970).
29 August – Paul Martin Dahlø, politician (died 1967)
12 September – Lars Sverkeson Romundstad, politician (died 1961)
29 September – Karl Johan Fjermeros, politician (died 1972)

October to December
13 October – Viggo Brun, mathematician (died 1978)
17 November – Christian Ludvig Jensen, barrister, politician and organizational leader (died 1978).
23 November – Sverre Gjørwad, politician (died 1969)
26 November – Ole Jensen Rong, politician (died 1953)
6 December – Helge Klæstad, judge (died 1965)
9 December – Søren Hans Smith Sørensen, ship-owner and politician (died 1973)

Full date unknown
Olav Gullvåg, playwright, novelist, poet and editor (died 1961)
Magnhild Haalke, novelist (died 1984)
Alf Jacobsen, sailor and Olympic gold medallist
Arne Kildal, librarian and civil servant (died 1972)
Lars Magnus Moen, politician and Minister (died 1964)
Ulrik Olsen, politician and Minister (died 1963)

Deaths
13 May – Christian Torber Hegge Geelmuyden, navy officer and politician (born 1816)
12 September – Oluf Steen Julius Berner, politician (died 1809)

Full date unknown
Peter Christen Asbjørnsen, writer and scholar (born 1812)
Nils Jønsberg, priest and politician (born 1808)

See also

References